Vera Maud Searle  (née Palmer; 25 August 1901 – 12 September 1998) was a British sprinter and athletics administrator.

She was born in Leytonstone, London, on 25 August 1901  to Albert Palmer (1878–1935), assistant secretary of Chelsea Football Club, and Maud Mary Palmer (1879–1946). She was the eldest of four children.

In 1923 she co-founded the Middlesex Ladies Athletics Club, now the Ealing Southall & Middlesex Athletics Club. Later the same year, she participated at the first WAAA Championships taking bronze medal in running 220 yards.

Competing as Vera Palmer, she set a world record at 250 metres of 35.4 seconds in 1923 Paris and in 1925, again set a world record at 250 metres of 33.8 seconds at Stamford Bridge.  In 1924 she participated at the 1924 Women's Olympiad and won the silver medal in running 250 m and the gold medal in the relay 4 x 220 yards.

In August 1926, she won silver in the 250m at the 1926 Women's World Games, held at the Slottsskogsvallen Stadium in Gothenburg, Sweden.

In October 1926, she married Wilfred Edwin Searle, and they had two daughters together; Brenda born 1928 and Angela born 1935.

She was honorary secretary of the Women's Amateur Athletic Association (WAAA) from 1930 to 1933, vice-chairman from 1959 to 1973, chairman from 1973 to 1981, and later president until the WAAA merged with the Amateur Athletic Association in 1991. She received the OBE in 1979 for services to athletics.

She died in Tunbridge Wells, Kent, on 12 September 1998.

References

1901 births
1998 deaths
British female sprinters
Officers of the Order of the British Empire
People from Leytonstone
Women's World Games medalists